Hariulf (Latin: Hariulfus) was a Burgundian prince during the 4th century.

An inscription records one Hariulfus, son of Hanhavaldus, of the royal family of the Burgundians (regalis gentis Burgundionum), who was already a protector domesticus when he died at the age of twenty in the imperial court in Augusta Treverorum (Germania Superior), probably under the Roman Emperor Valentinian I (reign 364-375 AD):

This inscription was found in 1877 at Trier, Germany.

References

Burgundian warriors
Princes
Ancient Roman military personnel
4th-century births
4th-century deaths